T. robustus  may refer to:
 Tarachodes robustus, a praying mantis species
 Trichobatrachus robustus, the hairy frog, a Central African frog species
 Tripterotyphis robustus, a sea snail species

See also
 Robustus (disambiguation)